Indian South Africans are South Africans who descend from indentured labourers and free migrants who arrived from British India during the late 1800s and early 1900s. The majority live in and around the city of Durban, making it one of the largest ethnically Indian-populated cities outside of India.

As a consequence of the policies of apartheid, Indian (synonymous with Asian) is regarded as a race group in South Africa.

Racial identity
During the colonial era, Indians were accorded the same subordinate status in South African society as Blacks were by the white minority, which held the vast majority of political power. During the period of apartheid from 1948 to 1994, Indian South Africans were called and often voluntarily accepted, terms which ranged from "Asians" to "Indians", and were legally classified as being members of a single racial group. Some Indian South Africans believed that these terms were improvements on the negatively defined identity of "Non-White", which was their previous status. Politically conscious and nationalistic Indian South Africans wanted to show both their heritage and their local roots in South Africa. Increasingly they self-identified as "African", "South African" and, when necessary, "Indian South Africans". During the most intense period of segregation and apartheid, "Indian", "Asian", "Coloured" and "Malay" group identities controlled numerous aspects of daily life, including where a classified person was permitted to live and study.

The "Indian" racial identity was created by both internal political movements that sought to consolidate support amongst the different Indian ethnicities in the face of discrimination; and the Apartheid government which strictly codified the physical and cultural boundaries between "race groups", and encouraged these group identities. As a result of these Apartheid rules, South Africans continue to identify themselves, and informally classify each other as, "blacks", "whites", "Coloureds" and "Indians". Despite having a presence in South Africa for more than 150 years, and being an officially recognized part of the population since 1961, Indians are still sometimes viewed as a foreign presence in the country, and find themselves having to justify their belonging to South Africa as a homeland.

History

Indentured labourers and Passenger Indians

The modern South African Indian community is largely descended from Indians who arrived in South Africa from 1860 onwards. The first 342 of these came on board the Truro from Madras, followed by the Belvedere from Calcutta. They were transported as indentured labourers to work on the sugarcane plantations of Natal Colony, and, in total, approximately 200,000 Indians arrived as indentured labourers over a period of 5 decades, later also as indentured coal miners and railway workers. The indentured labourers tended to speak Tamil, Telugu, Bhojpuri and the Awadhi dialect of Hindi, and the majority were Hindu with Muslim and Christian minorities. Indians were imported as it was found by colonial authorities that local black Africans were economically inefficient, and thus unwilling to subject themselves to employment by colonial farmers, while other colonial authorities believed that the "hunting and warrior" African culture of the time was incompatible with a sudden shift to employed labour. The Mercury newspaper favoured the importation of labour, although other Natal newspapers were against the idea. In general, the importation of labour was not viewed as politically important by colonists when it was proposed, and the importation of Indian labour was driven by lobbying by a relatively small group of sugar planters, and the long-term consequences of Indian immigration (the establishment of a permanent Indian population in Natal) were not taken into account (by 1904, Indians outnumbered whites in Natal). Although 1860 is dated as the beginning of Indian settlement in Natal, a farmer called ER Rathbone was the first to introduce Indian labour to the colony in 1849.

Indentured labourers on sugar plantations were frequently mistreated, and lived in unsanitary conditions.  A large percentage of indentured labourers returned to India following the expiry of their terms, and some of those who returned alerted authorities in India to abuses taking place in Natal, which led to new safeguards being put in place before further recruiting of indentured labourers was allowed to take place.

Former indentured labourers who didn't return to India quickly established themselves as an important general labour force in Natal particularly as industrial and railway workers, with others engaging in market gardening, growing most of the vegetables consumed by the white population. Indians also became fishermen, and worked as clerks; in the postal service; and as court interpreters.

The remaining Indian immigration was from passenger Indians, comprising traders and others who migrated to South Africa shortly after the indentured labourers, paid for their own fares and travelled as British subjects. These immigrant Indians who became traders were from varying religious backgrounds, namely Hindu and Muslims but largely from Gujarat (including Memons and Surtis), later joined by Konkanis, and Urdu speakers from Uttar Pradesh. The Muslims played an important part in the establishment of Islam in the areas where they settled. Indian traders were sometimes referred to as "Arab traders" because of their dress, and because large numbers of them were Muslim.

Passenger Indians, who initially operated in Durban, expanded inland, to the South African Republic (Transvaal), establishing communities in settlements on the main road between Johannesburg and Durban. Natal's Indian traders rapidly displaced small white shop owners in trade with other Indians, and with black Africans, causing resentment among white businesses.

Researchers have made efforts to collect and make available shipping lists of Indian immigrants.

Early discrimination (1860-1910)

Indians faced discrimination to varying degrees in all the parts of South Africa.

Natal
Indians faced repressive legislation in Natal. They were forced to carry passes in 1888. In 1893, M. K. Gandhi arrived in South Africa to represent an Indian businessman in a legal dispute. Following his arrival in South Africa, Gandhi experienced racial discrimination, and, following the proposal of legislation to restrict Indian voting rights in Natal, he helped organise resistance, leading to the formation of the Natal Indian Congress. This organised resistance led to the unification of disparate groups of South African Indians for the first time. Although the bill was defeated, it was successfully reintroduced in 1896.

Transvaal
The South African Republic government first instituted discriminatory legislation against Indians in 1885, which led to protests from the British government, as the Indians were British subjects, and was used as one of the casus belli for the Second Boer War. Indians were banned from working in the mining industry, and areas were set aside for coolie locations in various towns in the Transvaal. Persons of colour could also not walk on sidewalks in the Transvaal. Following the end of the Second Boer War, the new colonial administration of the Transvaal Colony continued to maintain the same discriminatory practices against Indians.

Cape Colony
Passenger Indians who moved to the Cape Colony, although facing petty discrimination, were generally well treated, could own property, could vote, and could trade freely. Many Muslim men in this group married Cape Malay women, and their children were later often classified as Cape Malay as part of the wider group classified as Coloureds.

Orange Free State
Indians were prohibited by an 1891 statute from living in the Orange Free State, then an independent Boer Republic, and this led to the almost total absence of Indians from the area, a situation that persisted into the apartheid era.

Union of South Africa (1910-1948)
Efforts to encourage Indians to repatriate to India included financial incentives, as well as discriminatory treatment. In December 1926, and January 1927, the South African government and Indian authorities had a Round Table conference where it was agreed that the Indian government would create a scheme for the repatriation of Indians, with the South African government agreeing to "uplift" the Indians who remained, monitored by an Indian government Agent. However, fewer Indians than expected repatriated, and racial tensions continued to simmer between Indians and whites, into the 1940s.

Apartheid (1948-1994)

The Durban riots was an anti-Indian riot predominantly by Zulus targeting Indians in Durban, South Africa in January 1949. The riots resulted in the massacre of mostly poor Indians. In total 142 people died in the riots and another 1,087 people were injured. It also led to the destruction of 58 shops, 247 dwellings and one factory.

Discriminated against by apartheid legislation, such as the Group Areas Act, applied in 1950, Indians were forcibly moved into Indian townships, and had their movements restricted. They were not allowed to reside in the Orange Free State Province, and needed special permission to enter or transit through that province. They were also, as a matter of state policy, given an inferior education compared to white South Africans.The effects of apartheid's unequal education system can still be felt today The Asiatic Land Tenure and the Indian Representative Act of 1946 were repealed.

The Population Registration Act, 1950 initially defined Indians as being part of the Coloured population.

In 1961, Indians were officially recognised as permanent part of the South African population, the Department of Indian Affairs was established, with a white minister in charge. In 1968, the South African Indian Council came into being, serving as a link between the government and the Indian people.

The University of Durban-Westville (now part of the University of KwaZulu-Natal) was built with a Rand-for-Rand contribution from Indian South Africans and the government in the 1970s. Before that, Indian students had to take a ferry to Salisbury Island's abandoned prison, which served as their university.

Casual racist expressions were used during the years of apartheid. Indians in South Africa were (and sometimes still are) referred to by the racial epithet 'coolie'.

In 1968, the South African Indian Council (not to be confused with the anti-apartheid South African Indian Congress which had the same initials) was created by the government, and in 1974, the council was reconstituted to allow for 50% of its members to be elected by Indians. The Council did not enjoy much support, for example, in 1981, only 6% of eligible voters participated in elections for the council.

In 1983, the Constitution was reformed to allow the Coloured and Indian minorities a limited participation in separate and subordinate Houses of a Tricameral Parliament, a development which enjoyed limited support and very low voter turnouts. The Indian house was called the House of Delegates. Some aspects of Indian life were regulated by this house, including education. The theory was that the Indian minority could be allowed limited rights, but the Black majority were to become citizens of independent homelands. These separate arrangements were removed by the negotiations which took place from 1990 on to provide all South Africans with the vote.

Post-apartheid

Post-apartheid politics
Many Indians played an important role in the anti-apartheid struggle and some occupied positions of power in post-apartheid South Africa. In post-apartheid South Africa, Indians have maintained prominent positions in the ruling African National Congress.

Amichand Rajbansi's Minority Front (formerly the National People's Party) retained some support in its strongholds. However, after Rajbansi's death in 2011, the party failed to win any seats in the national assembly following the 2014 general election.

Indians who were citizens before 1994, and thus discriminated against by the apartheid system, are considered black for the purposes of Employment Equity; that is, they are classified as having been disadvantaged under apartheid. They are thus eligible for "affirmative action" and Black Economic Empowerment allocations.

Post-apartheid immigration from South Asia

Following the end of apartheid, a new wave of South Asian immigration commenced from India, Bangladesh, Pakistan and Sri Lanka, paralleling the movement of Africans from the diaspora and neighbouring African countries to the post-apartheid South Africa. These recent migrants are usually not regarded as being part of the Indian community, although they often live in traditionally Indian areas.

Among these post-apartheid immigrants, the controversial Gupta family from India, managed to acquire vast political and economic influence in a short time, under the reign of former President Jacob Zuma.

Before European settlement, and Dutch slavery in the Cape

Traders from India may have been active on the eastern coast of South Africa for centuries, including before the Dutch settlement of the Cape Colony in 1652.

A significant proportion of slaves imported into the Cape were from parts of India (which included present-day Bangladesh), Indonesia and Sri Lanka. While South African scholars mistakenly assumed these slaves were bought in "slave markets", many of the slaves were victims of kidnapping. Many slaves had no identity as Indians and were subsumed into the "Cape Coloured" and Cape Malay communities. White Afrikaners also may have some Indian slave ancestry, an example of this being former State President F.W. de Klerk, who revealed in his autobiography that one of his ancestors was a female slave called Diana of Bengal. There is no reference to the real names of these Indians and were given "Christian" names for convenience. This all contributed to the loss of identity similar to the Mozambicans and other slaves who were brought to the Cape. Indian slaves who were Muslim became part of the Cape Malay community after they were freed, initially adopting the Malay language, and then Afrikaans.
 
An early Indian to settle in South Africa was Kalaga Prabhu, a Goud Saraswat Brahmin merchant from Cochin. He was the foremost among the Konkani merchants in Cochin (modern day Kochi in Kerala). As punishment for conspiring with the Mysorean Muslim king Hyder Ali to overthrow the king of Cochin, Kalaga Prabhu and his son Chorda Prabhu were arrested by the Dutch and exiled with their families for life to the Cape of Good Hope in 1771. No further record of this individual and his descendants if any exists.

Religion
 
Almost all South African Indians are either Hindu, Muslim, or Christian. There are also small groups of Parsis, Sikhs, and Buddhists. The majority of South African Muslims are Indian or belong to the multi-ethnic community in the Western Cape.

The proportion of Indian South Africans following Hinduism has decreased from 50% in 1996 to 47.27% in 2001. This further decreased to 41.3% in 2016, mainly due to the conversion of "Hindus into Christians" by the Christian missionaries.

Education
Like Coloureds, until the end of Apartheid, Indian children largely attended segregated Indian government schools, which were administered nationally, and wrote separate matriculation examinations. These arrangements ended by 1997.

Until 1991, state government schools taught in English, with the choice of one of five Indian languages, namely Hindi, Gujarati, Tamil, Telugu and Urdu to be taken as non-examination subjects. But, the languages were dropped from state run schools. The national council for eastern languages have requested the government to teach these five languages. The provincial government agreed to allow these languages to be taught in KwaZulu-Natal. These languages can be chosen as third language up to final year of school.

Languages

South African Indian English 
English is the first language of most Indian South Africans. Indians first began to arrive in South Africa between 1860 and 1911, when over 150,000 Indians were brought into Natal, mainly as slaves to work on plantations. From the 1950s on, English came to be taught to Indian children in schools, leading to language shift taking place, with English becoming the first language of the majority.

Because these children were separated by apartheid from British children, their English developed in very different ways from South African English. In recent decades, the dialect has come much closer to the standard language through the model taught in schools. The result is a variety of English which mixes features of Indian, South African, Standard British, creole, and foreign language learning Englishes in a unique and fascinating way.

Current status of Indian languages 
A minority, especially older people, are fluent in their ancestral Indian languages such as Tamil, Gujarati, Marathi, Bengali, Odia, Bhojpuri, Malayalam, Urdu, Hindi, Telugu and others as a first language or second language. In some small towns in the former Transvaal, Afrikaans is used as a first language by older Indians. Almost all younger people use English for day-to-day communication. The compulsory second language taught at school, such as Afrikaans or Zulu is either spoken or understood.

As a result of promotion by cultural organisations, or the influence of Indian cinema industries, many younger Indians can understand (but not usually speak) Indian languages to a limited degree.

Recent immigrants from India, Pakistan and Bangladesh have maintained fluency in their mother tongues.

Cuisine

Curried dishes are popular in South Africa among people of all ethnic origins; many dishes came to the country with the thousands of Indian labourers brought to South Africa in the nineteenth century. South African Indian cuisine adapted to local ingredients, and dishes include a variety of curries, rotis, sweetmeats, chutneys, fried snacks such as samosa (called samoosa in South Africa), and other savoury foods. Bunny chow, an Indian dish from Durban, consisting of a hollowed-out loaf of bread filled with curry, was invented through a nessecity as Indians were not allowed to eat at their own restaurants, forms part of mainstream South African cuisine and has become quite popular.

Media and entertainment
Although Indian languages are seldom spoken or understood by younger Indians, English-subtitled Indian films and television programmes remain popular among South African Indians. These are broadcast both by the DStv satellite television service, which carries Zee TV, B4U, NDTV, and a Hindi-language Sony channel. In addition, Tamil–language channels, Sun TV and KTV, were introduced in 2004.

The largest website dedicated to Indian South Africans is Indian Spice. It publishes news in all aspects of public life that affect the South Asian community in Southern Africa (including Mauritius and Kenya) and conducts journalistic investigations of its own into matters of criminal, political and social interest through its subsidiary Kali.

DVD, and previously, video versions of Bollywood films are widely available. Large cinema chains like Ster-Kinekor began showing Bollywood films by the early 2000s Bollywood comes to South Africa. Indian culture in South Africa has some similarities to the worldwide Desi subculture, however, South African Indians developed a distinctive musical and literary culture of their own, which was to some extent eclipsed by the global Bollywood/Desi culture in the 1990s and 2000s. There is also an increasing amount of interest in Turkish popular culture, by Muslims in particular.We found the Grandchild of Abu Bakr Effendi in South Africa

The slang term charou (various spellings) is often used by Indians, particularly in the Durban area, to refer to themselves.

Card games, in particular, the trick-taking card game Thunee (similar to Twenty-eight) are popular among South African Indians.

Radio Hindvani is a community radio station based in Durban and is aimed at the promotion of Hindi culture and language amongst South Africans. The station's frequency reaches Durban and all surrounding areas.

The South African Broadcasting Corporation (SABC) also has an Indian-oriented radio service called Lotus FM, launched during the apartheid era, and began some showing Indian-focused programming in the 90's including locally produced magazine shows. Bollywood movies have been broadcast by the SABC. The Sunday Times has a supplement distributed in Indian areas called the Extra, and the Sunday Tribune publishes a similar supplement, called the Herald. A Bollywood section, 'Bollyworld' is published by the Daily News on Mondays.

Events
Among the major charity and cultural events in South Africa, organised every year by the local Indian community is the Gandhi Walk, which is the oldest event in South Africa commemorating Mahatma Gandhi. Held annually in Lenasia, south of Johannesburg, it has been held 34 times.

The Durban Festival of Chariots is organised annually at the beachfront by the ISKCON. The festival is attended by tens of thousands of people. In Lenasia a gala fund-raising banquet of the Saaberie Chishty Ambulance Service is held annually.

Notable Indian South Africans

 Hashim Amla, cricketer
 Kader Asmal, activist
 Amina Cachalia, activist
 Yusuf Cassim, politician
 Yusuf Dadoo, politician
 Gopala Davies, actor, director
 Arun Manilal Gandhi, activist
 Ela Gandhi, activist
 Frene Ginwala, journalist and politician
 Kesaveloo Goonam, doctor, activist
 Pravin Gordhan, politician
 Christopher Hyman, businessman and racing driver
 Raoul Hyman, racing driver
 Soromini Kallichurum, dean
 Adhir Kalyan, actor
 Ahmed Kathrada, politician 
 Alan Khan, broadcaster
 Keshav Maharaj, cricketer
 Mac Maharaj, activist
 Rashida Manjoo, former United Nations Special Rapporteur on Violence Against Women
 Riaad Moosa, comedian, doctor
 Senuran Muthusamy, cricketer
 Anand Naidoo, journalist
 Jailoshini Naidoo, actress
 Tarina Patel, actress, producer, model and philanthropist 
 Jay Naidoo, activist
 Kumi Naidoo, activist
 Billy Nair, politician
 Mishqah Parthiephal, actor
 Ebrahim Patel, politician
 Navi Pillay, jurist
 Ravi Pillay, politician
 Sagaren Pillay, rear-admiral
 Leeanda Reddy, actor
 Luther Singh, footballer
 Enver Surty, politician
 Sonny Venkatrathnam, activist
 Yusuf Maart
 Zain Bhikha

See also

Asians in Africa
Memons in South Africa
Tamil South Africans
Islam in South Africa
India–South Africa relations
High yellow
Anglo-Indian people

References

External links

 Indian Diaspora in South Africa, from the Report of the High Level Committee on The Indian Diaspora (2001) of the Non-resident Indian and Persons of Indian Origin Division of the Ministry of External Affairs of India
 2001 Digital Census Atlas 
 History of Indian Settlement
 Indian Chronology

Asian South African
Ethnic groups in South Africa